Gargar Mandala (Kannada: ಗರ್ ಗರ್ ಮಂಡ್ಲ) is a 2014 Indian Kundapura Kannada film directed by Ravi Basrur and produced under the banner Inkfinite Pictures. It stars Adarsh and Shemith as the lead pair, supported by Omguru and Vijay Basrur and others.

Cast
 Adarsh as Surya
 Shemith as Anitha
 Omguru as Guru
 Vijay Basrur as Ravishankar
 Uday Basrur as Murulinath
 Satish Basrur as Satish
 Raghu Pandeshwar as Pandu
 Raghavendra as Udaya
 Manju as Manju
 Chandrashekar as Chandra
 Sowmya as Sharada

Production
The movie is produced under the banner of Inkfinite Pictures, Bangalore.

Filming
The locations where the film was shot at includes Basrur, Major parts of Kundapur Taluk and Shilong (The capital of Meghalaya). Two different cameras were used to suit different situations and locations.

Soundtrack
The music of the film is composed by Ravi Basrur with lyrics written by Ashok Neelavara, Sachin, & Panak Makkal team. The soundtrack has eight songs in total.

Track List

Audio Release
Ugramm fame actor Srimurali released the movie's audio CDs in Bangalore.

References

External links
 Gar Gar...First Commercial Film in Kundapur language on New Indian Express
 First Commercial Kundapur Kannada Movie hit screens in April  on Tulunadu News
 ಕುಂದಾಪುರ ಕನ್ನಡದ ಸಿನೆಮಾ ಗರ್‍ಗರ್‍ಮಂಡ್ಲ ಶೀಘ್ರ ತೆರೆಗೆ on Kundapra.com

2014 films
2010s Kannada-language films